Nancy Aptanik (1959) is an Inuit artist known for her stone carvings and textile works. 

Her work is included in the collections of the Winnipeg Art Gallery and the Penn Museum, Philadelphia.

References

1959 births
20th-century Canadian women artists
21st-century Canadian women artists
Living people
Inuit artists